Berea, Tennessee may refer to:

Berea, Giles County, Tennessee
Berea, Warren County, Tennessee